Reilly Opelka was the defending champion but chose not to defend his title.

Lucas Pouille won the title after defeating Mikael Ymer 6–3, 6–3 in the final.

Seeds
All seeds receive a bye into the second round.

Draw

Finals

Top half

Section 1

Section 2

Bottom half

Section 3

Section 4

References

External links
Main draw
Qualifying draw

BNP Paribas Primrose Bordeaux - Singles
2019 Singles